Coilochilus is a genus of flowering plants in the orchid family, Orchidaceae. It contains only one known species, Coilochilus neocaledonicum, endemic to New Caledonia. Its closest relative is Cryptostylis, sole other genus of subtribe Cryptostylidinae.

See also 
 List of Orchidaceae genera

References 

 Pridgeon, A.M., Cribb, P.J., Chase, M.A. & Rasmussen, F. eds. (1999). Genera Orchidacearum 1. Oxford Univ. Press.
 Pridgeon, A.M., Cribb, P.J., Chase, M.A. & Rasmussen, F. eds. (2001). Genera Orchidacearum 2. Oxford Univ. Press.
 Pridgeon, A.M., Cribb, P.J., Chase, M.A. & Rasmussen, F. eds. (2003). Genera Orchidacearum 3. Oxford Univ. Press.
 Berg Pana, H. 2005. Handbuch der Orchideen-Namen. Dictionary of Orchid Names. Dizionario dei nomi delle orchidee. Ulmer, Stuttgart.

External links 

Cryptostylidinae
Endemic flora of New Caledonia
Orchids of New Caledonia
Monotypic Orchidoideae genera
Diurideae genera